Growing Up in Public is the third studio album by British rapper Professor Green. It was released on 19 September 2014 through Virgin Records. The album features appearances from the likes of Tori Kelly, Example, Mr Probz, Rizzle Kicks and James Craise among others. The album continues the themes covered on his second studio album, At Your Inconvenience (2011).

The album's first promotional single, "Not Your Man", was released as an "instant grat" through the iTunes Store on 7 July 2014. The album's second promotional single, "I Need Church", was released as an "instant grat" on 16 July. The album's lead single, "Lullaby", featuring singer-songwriter Tori Kelly, was released on 14 September 2014. The song received its radio debut on BBC Radio 1 on 28 July 2014, but was premiered at the Leicester Music Festival at Welford Road Stadium on 25 July. The album's third promotional single, "Dead Man's Shoes", was released on 19 September 2014. "Little Secrets", featuring Mr Probz, is the album's second single. It was released on 7 December 2014, peaking at number 83 on the UK Singles Chart.

Background
Green expressed interest to work with artists such as former collaborators Emeli Sandé and Lily Allen, as well as Ed Sheeran  and Lana Del Rey on the album, however, no collaborations featuring any of the listed names are featured. Green announced that production on the album would come from the likes of Mike Skinner, Sid Wilson of Slipknot, iSHi, Pharrell Williams and Skrillex. However, Example doesn't feature on the album version. A promotional non-album single, titled "Are You Getting Enough?", featuring Miles Kane, was released on 21 July 2013. After the single failed to chart in the top 100, Green announced that the first "proper" single from the album would be released in January 2014 and the album would follow shortly. These were later delayed to July and September 2014 respectively. He has also delayed his planned UK tour twice, firstly from November 2013 to May 2014, and then May 2014 to December 2014, to coincide with the release of the album.

Green also performed new tracks entitled titled "I Need Church" and "Little Secrets" in his 2013 live sets. Green has also posted clips of new songs "Name in Lights" (produced by Cores and featuring Rizzle Kicks) and "Jealous Girl" on his Instagram. Tweets and Instagram posts have also revealed a collaboration with Wretch 32 and iSHi titled "Gross" and another track titled "The Middle". Green also posted a short clip of a collaboration with iSHI and Ella Eyre which didn't make the album. On 14 April 2014 Green released a 54-second teaser of the album's first promotional single, "Not Your Man", which features vocals from Thabo. In 2014, he appeared on a remix of "German Whip" by Meridian Dan, also featuring Skepta, Bossman Birdie and Jordan Stephens. "Not Your Man" premiered in full on 3 July 2014, and was released on 5 July as an "instant grat" download on iTunes when you pre-ordered the album. The album's second "instant grat" promotional single, "I Need Church", was released on 16 July. The lead single from the album, "Lullaby" featuring Tori Kelly, was released on 14 September 2014. "Dead Man's Shoes" was released as the third and final instant grat single on 19 September 2014. Growing Up in Public was released on 22 September 2014.

Track listing

Notes
 "In the Shadow of the Sun" samples vocals and production from "Shadow of the Sun" by Max Elto (f.k.a. Taped Rai)

Personnel

 Richard Adlam - drum programming
 Samuel Agard - drums
 Glyn Aikins - A&R
 Erik Alcock - songwriter
 Harley Alexander-Sule - songwriter
 Lily Allen - songwriter
 Matt Allen - guitar
 Iyiola Babalola - engineer
 Lorraine Barnes - choir/chorus
 Tom Barnes - songwriter, drums
 Awsa Bergstrom - choir/chorus
 Jules Buckley - string arrangements
 Wez Clarke - mixing, programming
 James Craise - songwriter, featured artist, vocals
 DJ Khalil - engineer, instrumentation, producer, programming
 Mark O. Everett - songwriter
 Future Cut - vocal producer
 The Futuristics - keyboards, producer, programming
 John Gibbons - choir/chorus
 Rick Guest - photography
 Wendy Harriott - choir/chorus
 Stuart Hawkes - mastering
 Alex "Cores" Hayes - additional production, songwriter, engineer, executive producer, keyboards, producer, programming, vocal engineer, vocal producer
 Edward Hayes - songwriter, guitar
 Warren Huart - vocal engineer
 Tom Hull - songwriter
 Ken "Duro" Ifill - mixing
 Pranam Injeti - songwriter, engineer, instrumentation, producer, programming
 Felix Joseph - songwriter, engineer, producer, programming
 Pete Kelleher - songwriter, keyboards
 Tori Kelly - featured artist, vocals
 Joe Khajadourian - songwriter
 Kid Harpoon - engineer, guitar, producer, programming
 Ben Kohn - bass, songwriter
 KZ - keyboards, percussion, producer, programming
 Jenny LaTouche - choir/chorus
 Darren Lewis - engineer
 Tom Liljegren - songwriter
 Chris Loco - songwriter, engineer, keyboards, percussion, producer, programming
 Stephen Manderson - songwriter, executive producer
 Patsy McKay - choir/chorus, choir arrangement
 Beverlyn McKinson - choir/chorus
 Metropole Orkest - strings
 Mr. Probz - featured artist, vocals
 Mojam Music - engineer, producer, programming
 James Murray - songwriter, guitar
 Mustafa Omer - songwriter
 John Parish - songwriter
 Adam Prendergast - bass
 Professor Green - primary artist, vocals
 Khalil Abdul Rahman - songwriter
 Alex Reeves - drums
 Hal Ritson - sample organization
 Rizzle Kicks - featured artist, vocals
 Alexander Ryberg - songwriter
 Alex Schwartz - songwriter
 Aaron Sokell - choir/chorus
 Diana Stanbridge - choir/chorus
 Mark "Spike" Stent - mixing
 Jordan Stephens - songwriter
 Geoff Swan - mixing assistant
 Thabo - featured artist, vocals
 TMS - engineer, producer
 Jack Vasiliou - choir/chorus
 James Walsh - songwriter, guitar
 Whinnie Williams - featured artist, vocals
 Ina Wroldsen - songwriter, vocal arrangement

Credits adapted from AllMusic.

Release history

References

2014 albums
Albums produced by Chris Loco
Professor Green albums